Sirpa Kähkönen (born 15 September 1964) is a Finnish novelist and translator. Initially writing for young adults, she gained popularity in Finland with her Kuopio series of historical novels.

Born in Kuopio, Kähkönen studied literature and history before working as an editor. She embarked on her literary career in 1991 with Kuu taskussa (Moon in your Pocket) for young adults, publishing her first adult novel Mustat morsiamet (Black Brides, 1998), which earned her the Savonia Award in 1999. Her latest work Graniittimies (Granite Man) is a historical novel depicting the lives of young Finns in Soviet times.

References

1964 births
Living people
People from Kuopio
Finnish women novelists
Writers from North Savo
Finnish translators
20th-century Finnish women writers
21st-century Finnish women writers
Finnish historical novelists
20th-century translators
Women historical novelists
20th-century Finnish novelists
21st-century Finnish novelists